Enrico Pascal Valtorta (14 May 1883 – 3 September 1951) was the last Apostolic Vicar and the first Roman Catholic bishop of Hong Kong.

He was born in Italy at Carate Brianza, and was ordained priest in Milan on 30 March 1907 for the Pontifical Institute for Foreign Missions (PIME).

He arrived in Hong Kong on 5 October 1907 and from 1909 to 1911 was apostolic missionary for Nam Tau (San On District) and Sai Kung (New Territories); Rector of St. Joseph's Church at Garden Road and teacher at seminary in 1913; chaplain to Victoria Gaol (1921–1925).
Appointed 4th Vicar Apostolic of Hong Kong on 8 March 1926, was consecrated titular bishop of Lerus on 13 June 1926. Hong Kong Apostolic Vicariate was raised to a diocese on 11 April 1946. Bishop Valtorta was installed as bishop of the Hong Kong Diocese on 31 October 1948. He died in Hong Kong in 1951.

Valtorta College in Tai Po was named after him.

See also
Catholic Diocese of Hong Kong

External links
His Biography by the Catholic Church

20th-century Roman Catholic bishops in Hong Kong
Roman Catholic bishops of Hong Kong
1883 births
1951 deaths
20th-century Italian titular bishops